Genevieve Feiwen Lee is an American pianist and musicologist. She is the Everett S. Olive Professor of Music at Pomona College in Claremont, California.

Early life and education 
Lee attended the Peabody Conservatory of Music and École Normale de Musique de Paris before completing her doctorate in musical arts at Yale University.

Career 
Lee began teaching at Pomona in 1994. She plays the piano, harpsichord, toy piano, keyboard, and electronic instruments.

Recognition 
Lee received a Grammy nomination in 2016 in the Best Chamber Music/Small Ensemble Performance category alongside Nadia Shpachenko for Flaherty: Airdancing For Toy Piano, Piano & Electronics.

References

External links
Faculty page at Pomona College

Year of birth missing (living people)
Living people
Pomona College faculty
American pianists
Peabody Institute alumni
American women pianists
American harpsichordists
American keyboardists
American electronic musicians
École Normale de Musique de Paris alumni
Yale School of Music alumni
American women musicologists
American musicologists
21st-century American women